This is a list of electoral divisions and wards in the ceremonial county of Cumbria in North West England. All changes since the re-organisation of local government following the passing of the Local Government Act 1972 are shown. The number of councillors elected for each electoral division or ward is shown in brackets.

Unitary authorities

Cumberland

Wards from 1 April 2023 (first election 5 May 2022):

Westmorland and Furness

Wards from 1 April 2023 (first election 5 May 2022):

Former county council

Cumbria

Electoral Divisions from 1 April 1974 (first election 12 April 1973) to 7 May 1981:

Electoral Divisions from 7 May 1981 to 7 June 2001:

Electoral Divisions from 7 June 2001 to 2 May 2013:

Electoral Divisions from 2 May 2013 to 1 April 2023:

Former district councils

Allerdale

Wards from 1 April 1974 (first election 7 June 1973) to 3 May 1979:

Wards from 3 May 1979 to 6 May 1999:

Wards from 6 May 1999 to 2 May 2019:

Wards from 2 May 2019 to 1 April 2023:

Barrow-in-Furness

Wards from 1 April 1974 (first election 7 June 1973) to 3 May 1979:

Wards from 3 May 1979 to 6 May 1999:

Wards from 6 May 1999 to 1 May 2008:

Wards from 1 May 2008 to 1 April 2023:

Carlisle

Wards from 1 April 1974 (first election 7 June 1973) to 5 May 1983:

Wards from 5 May 1983 to 6 May 1999:

Wards from 6 May 1999 to 2 May 2019:

Wards from 2 May 2019 to 1 April 2023:

Copeland

Wards from 1 April 1974 (first election 7 June 1973) to 3 May 1979:

Wards from 3 May 1979 to 6 May 1999:

Wards from 6 May 1999 to 2 May 2019:

Wards from 2 May 2019 to 1 April 2023:

Eden

Wards from 1 April 1974 (first election 7 June 1973) to 3 May 1979:

Wards from 3 May 1979 to 6 May 1999:

Wards from 6 May 1999 to 1 April 2023:

South Lakeland

Wards from 1 April 1974 (first election 7 June 1973) to 3 May 1979:

Wards from 3 May 1979 to 6 May 1999:

Wards from 6 May 1999 to 1 May 2008:

Wards from 1 May 2008 to 3 May 2018:

Wards from 3 May 2018 to 1 April 2023:

Electoral wards by constituency

Barrow and Furness
Barrow Island, Broughton, Central, Crake Valley, Dalton North, Dalton South, Hawcoat, Hindpool, Low Furness and Swarthmoor, Newbarns, Ormsgill, Parkside, Risedale, Roosecote, Ulverston Central, Ulverston East, Ulverston North, Ulverston South, Ulverston Town, Ulverston West, Walney North, Walney South.

Carlisle
Belah, Belle Vue, Botcherby, Burgh, Castle, Currock, Dalston, Denton Holme, Harraby, Morton, St Aidans, Stanwix Urban, Upperby, Wetheral, Yewdale.

Copeland
Arlecdon, Beckermet, Bootle, Bransty, Cleator Moor North, Cleator Moor South, Crummock, Dalton, Derwent Valley, Distington, Egremont North, Egremont South, Ennerdale, Frizington, Gosforth, Harbour, Haverigg, Hensingham, Hillcrest, Holborn Hill, Kells, Keswick, Millom Without, Mirehouse, Moresby, Newtown, St Bees, Sandwith, Seascale.

Penrith and The Border
Alston Moor, Appleby (Appleby), Appleby (Bongate), Askham, Brampton, Brough, Crosby Ravensworth, Dacre, Eamont, Great Corby and Geltsdale, Greystoke, Hartside, Hayton, Hesket, Irthing, Kirkby Stephen, Kirkby Thore, Kirkoswald, Langwathby, Lazonby, Long Marton, Longtown & Rockcliffe, Lyne, Morland, Orton With Tebay, Penrith Carleton, Penrith East, Penrith North, Penrith Pategill, Penrith South, Penrith West, Ravenstonedale, Shap, Skelton, Stanwix Rural, Ullswater, Warcop.

Westmorland and Lonsdale
Arnside & Beetham, Burneside, Burton & Holme, Cartmel, Coniston, Crooklands, Grange, Hawkshead, Holker, Kendal Castle, Kendal Far Cross, Kendal Fell, Kendal Glebelands, Kendal Heron Hill, Kendal Highgate, Kendal Kirkland, Kendal Mintsfeet, Kendal Nether, Kendal Oxenholme, Kendal Parks, Kendal Stonecross, Kendal Strickland, Kendal Underley, Kirkby Lonsdale, Lakes Ambleside, Lakes Grasmere, Levens, Lyth Valley, Milnthorpe, Natland, Sedbergh, Staveley-in-Cartmel, Staveley-in-Westmorland, Whinfell, Windermere Applethwaite, Windermere Bowness North, Windermere Bowness South, Windermere Town.

Workington
All Saints, Aspatria, Boltons, Broughton St Bridget's, Christchurch, Clifton, Ellen, Ellenborough, Ewanrigg, Flimby, Harrington, Holme, Marsh, Moorclose, Moss Bay, Netherhall, St John's, St Michael's, Seaton, Silloth, Solway, Stainburn, Wampool, Waver, Wharrels.

See also
List of parliamentary constituencies in Cumbria

References

 
Cumbria
Wards